Alharbi or Al-Harbi (Arabic: الحربي) is an Arabic surname that refers to the Harb tribe, one of the Tribes of Arabia.

Notable people with the name include:
Farid Al-Harbi (born 1990), Saudi Arabian footballer
Hamad Al Harbi (born 1980), Kuwaiti footballer
Hamad Al-Harbi (born 1995), Qatari footballer
Helal Al-Harbi (born 1990), Saudi Arabian footballer
Ibrahim Al-Harbi (born 1975), Saudi Arabian footballer
Mansoor Al-Harbi (born 1987), Saudi Arabian footballer
Mazi Salih al Harbi (1981–2006), Saudi Arabian who died at Guantanamo Bay
Mishal al Harbi (born 1980), Saudi Arabian held at Guantanamo Bay (released 2005)
Mishal Sayed Al-Harbi (born 1975), Kuwaiti sprinter
Mohsin Al-Harbi (born 1980), Omani footballer
Osama Al Harbi (born 1984), Saudi Arabian footballer
Rayan Al-Harbi (footballer, born 1992) (born 1992), Saudi Arabian footballer
Saeed Al-Harbi (born 1981), Saudi Arabian footballer 
Waleed Al-Harbi (born 1986), Saudi Arabian footballer

See also 
Alharbi El Jadeyaoui (born 1986), French-born Moroccan footballer
Harbi (disambiguation)